2011 MD is a bright micro-asteroid, classified as near-Earth object of the Apollo and Amor group, respectively.

Description 

Although  was initially believed to be space junk, subsequent observations confirmed that it is an asteroid. A few hours before the asteroid's nearest approach in 2011, it appeared close to the Sun, so observations were possible for only a brief period. Backyard astronomers were able to observe it with telescopes from Australia, southern Africa, and the Americas.

 was discovered on 22 June 2011, by astronomers of the Lincoln Near-Earth Asteroid Research (LINEAR) at the U.S. Lincoln Laboratory Experimental Test Site in Socorro, New Mexico, by a pair of robotic telescopes. However, according to the more recent absolute magnitude (H) measurement of 28.1 and its albedo of 0.3, the asteroid is closer to 6 meters or 20 feet in diameter.

Emily Baldwin of Astronomy Now said that there was no threat of collision, and should the asteroid enter Earth's atmosphere, it would "mostly burn up in a brilliant fireball, possibly scattering a few meteorites", causing no likely harm to life or property on the ground.

During close approach the asteroid passed Earth at a relative speed of 6.7 km/s with a geocentric eccentricity of 1.1.

 was observed by the Spitzer Space Telescope in February 2014 and estimated to be  in diameter. The asteroid is a porous rubble pile with a density similar to water. On 19 June 2014, NASA reported that asteroid  was a prime candidate for capture by the Asteroid Redirect Mission (ARM) in the early 2020s.

Gallery

See also 
 Asteroid capture
 Asteroid Redirect Mission

References

External links 

 Encounter animations  (Pasquale Tricarico)
 
 
 

Minor planet object articles (unnumbered)

20110627
20110622